Francis Michael "The Animal" Bialowas (born September 25, 1970) is a Canadian former professional ice hockey player who played in four National Hockey League (NHL) games with the Toronto Maple Leafs during the 1993–94 season. He was known as an enforcer during his eleven-season playing career and was a member of the Philadelphia Phantoms' 1998 Calder Cup championship team. He was inducted into the Phantoms' Hall of Fame in 2005.

Career statistics

Regular season and playoffs

References

External links
 
 

1970 births
Living people
Canadian ice hockey defencemen
Canadian ice hockey left wingers
Danbury Trashers players
Estevan Bruins players
Hershey Bears players
Indianapolis Ice players
Kildonan North Stars players
Philadelphia Phantoms players
Portland Pirates players
Richmond Renegades players
Roanoke Valley Rebels players
St. John's Maple Leafs players
Ice hockey people from Winnipeg
Toronto Maple Leafs players
Undrafted National Hockey League players
Winkler Flyers players